West Schoolhouse may refer to:

 West Schoolhouse (Dennis, Massachusetts), listed on the National Register of Historic Places (NRHP) in Barnstable County
 West Schoolhouse (Wilmington, Massachusetts), NRHP-listed in Middlesex County

See also
West School (disambiguation)